HMS Waterloo was an 80-gun third-rate ship of the line, launched on 16 October 1818 at Portsmouth. She was designed by Henry Peake, and built by Nicholas Diddams at Portsmouth Dockyard and was the only ship built to her draught. She had originally been ordered as HMS Talavera, but was renamed on the stocks after the Battle of Waterloo.

In 1824 Waterloo was renamed HMS Bellerophon. She formed part of an experimental squadron, which were groups of ships sent out in the 1830s and 1840s to test new techniques of ship design, armament, building and propulsion.

She served as flagship to Rear Admiral Sir Charles Paget from 1836 to 1838.

Her only meaningful military activity was the bombardment of Sebastopol in June 1854 during the Crimean War.

She was placed on harbour service as a receiving ship in Portsmouth in 1856, and was sold in 1892 to J. Read jr. for breaking up.

Notes

References

Lavery, Brian (2003) The Ship of the Line - Volume 1: The development of the battlefleet 1650-1850. Conway Maritime Press. .

External links
 

Ships of the line of the Royal Navy
Ships built in Portsmouth
1818 ships